The Signal Hill Group is a siliciclastic Group of marine Ediacaran strata, cropping out in Newfoundland, in the eastern Bonavista Peninsula and the eastern Avalon peninsula.

It corresponds temporally to the Musgravetown Group further west.

References

Geology of Newfoundland and Labrador